Joseph Andreas Harris (born December 18, 1980) is a former American football running back in the National Football League. He played for the Carolina Panthers. He played college football for the Purdue Boilermakers.

College career

Coming into his senior season in 2003, Harris was ruled academically ineligible.

Statistics
Source:

References

1980 births
Living people
American football running backs
Carolina Panthers players
Purdue Boilermakers football players